Maria Kondratyevna Gorokhovskaya (17 October 1921 – 7 July 2001) was a Soviet gymnast of Jewish descent. At the 1952 Summer Olympics, she was the first woman to win seven medals at one Olympics. That is the highest number of medals won by a woman in a single Olympics, which is an achievement shared by only one other female athlete, the Australian swimmer Emma McKeon, who achieved that at the 2020 Summer Olympics held in 2021.

Competing for Budivelnyk Kharkiv, Gorokhovskaya won her first USSR title on the balance beam in 1948. She came to the Helsinki Olympics as the twofold national champion. Soviet gymnastics had never competed at major international tournaments before, and it was the first Olympics in which the country participated.

The Soviet gymnasts dominated the competition, with Gorokhovskaya leading them. In all four individual apparatus events – the balance beam, floor exercise, the vault and the uneven bars – Gorokhovskaya finished second. This performance earned her the gold medal in the all-around competition, finishing ahead of team-mate Nina Bocharova by eight tenths of a point.

With seven of the eight Soviet gymnasts finishing in the top ten, it was clear that the team gold medal would go to them. Gorokhovskaya won her seventh medal in the now discontinued team exercise with portable apparatus, where the Soviet team finished second behind Sweden.

Gorokhovskaya made one more international appearance as a part of the winning Soviet team at the 1954 World Championships, and retired afterwards. She then worked as a judge (international since 1964) and a lecturer.

In 1990, Gorokhovskaya, who was Jewish, emigrated to Israel, where she worked as a gymnastics coach until her death. In 1991 she was inducted into the International Jewish Sports Hall of Fame.

Achievements (non-Olympic)

See also

 List of multiple Olympic medalists at a single Games
 List of Olympic female gymnasts for the Soviet Union
 List of select Jewish gymnasts
 List of top Olympic gymnastics medalists

References

External links
 Complete list of competition results at Gymn Forum
 

1921 births
2001 deaths
People from Yevpatoria
International Jewish Sports Hall of Fame inductees
Honoured Masters of Sport of the USSR
Recipients of the Order of the Red Banner of Labour
Soviet emigrants to Israel
Soviet Jews
Israeli Jews
Soviet female artistic gymnasts
Olympic gold medalists for the Soviet Union
Olympic gymnasts of the Soviet Union
Olympic medalists in gymnastics
Olympic silver medalists for the Soviet Union
Gymnasts at the 1952 Summer Olympics
Medalists at the World Artistic Gymnastics Championships
Jewish gymnasts
Ukrainian Jews
Ukrainian female artistic gymnasts
Medalists at the 1952 Summer Olympics
World champion gymnasts